Perforating granuloma annulare is a skin condition of unknown cause, usually appearing on the dorsal hands, presenting as papules with a central keratotic core.

These lesions are often seen on the hands, arms, and ankles. Granuloma Annulare is characterized by rings of closely set, small, smooth, firm papules, usually skin colored, but they also may be slightly erythematous or have a purplish hue. Lesions vary in size from 1cm to 5cm. They are generally asymptomatic and nonpruritic (Fairlie, 2004). 
Reports of associations between Granuloma Annulare and diabetes mellitus, thyroid disease, malignancies, drug allergies, hypertension, arthritis, AIDS, and other conditions are being evaluated, but to date, no consistent association has been found (Rigopoulos et al., 2005).

See also 
 Granuloma annulare
 Skin lesion

References

External links 

Monocyte- and macrophage-related cutaneous conditions